Atila was a Spanish progressive rock group of the 1970s, based in Girona. The four-member band released two studio albums and a live album.

Discography
1975: The Beginning of the End – live album
1976: Intención
1977: Reviure

References

External links
The Spanish Progressive Rock Encyclopedia

Spanish progressive rock groups
Spanish pop music groups